Invitation to Hell may refer to:

Invitation to Hell (1982 film), British horror film 
Invitation to Hell (1984 film), American television horror film